Veljaci (Serbian Cyrillic: Вељаци) is a village in Bosnia and Herzegovina.

According to the 1991 census, the village is located in the municipality of Ljubuški. Veljaci is also known as the birth place of Stanko Zovak, a Los Angeles comedian, who has family from the village.

Demographics 
According to the 2013 census, its population was 1,249.

See also 
 Koćuša

References

Populated places in Ljubuški